Neocurtilla is a genus of northern mole crickets in the family Gryllotalpidae. There are about seven described species in Neocurtilla, found primarily in North, Central, and South America.

Species
These seven species belong to the genus Neocurtilla:
 Neocurtilla claraziana (Saussure, 1874)
 Neocurtilla hexadactyla (Perty, 1832) (northern mole cricket)
 Neocurtilla ingrischi Cadena-Castañeda, 2015
 Neocurtilla robusta Canhedo-Lascombe & Corseuil, 1996
 Neocurtilla scutata (Chopard, 1930)
 Neocurtilla townsendi Cadena-Castañeda, 2015
 † Neocurtilla schmidtgeni Zeuner, 1937

References

Further reading

 

Gryllotalpidae